Pineville is a town in Izard County, Arkansas, United States.  The population was 238 at the 2010 census.

Geography
Pineville is located in northwestern Izard County at  (36.155781, -92.113759). It is bordered to the south by the city of Calico Rock.

Highways 

 Arkansas Highway 56
 Arkansas Highway 177
 Arkansas Highway 223

Demographics

As of the census of 2010, there were 238 people, 97 households, and 72 families residing in the town.  The population density was 53.4/km (138.0/mi2).  There were 112 housing units at an average density of 23.9/km (61.7/mi2).  The racial makeup of the town was 97.1% White.

Of the 97 households, 27.8% had children under the age of 18 living with them, 58.8% were married couples living together, 11.3% had a female householder with no husband present, and 25.8% were non-families. 24.7% of all households were made up of individuals, and 12.4% had someone living alone who was 65 years of age or older.  The average household size was 2.45 and the average family size was 2.90.

In the town, the population was spread out, with 23.9% under the age of 20, 25.1% from 20 to 39, 25.2% from 40 to 59,  and 25.6% who were 60 years of age or older.  The median age was 40.5 years. The ratio of men to women was 52% men, 43% women.

The median income for a household in the town was $42,750, and the median income for a family was $47,857.

References

Towns in Izard County, Arkansas
Towns in Arkansas